Mohammad Ali Tarbiat (born May 26, 1877 — died January 17, 1940) was an Iranian revolutionary, politician and reformist. He founded the Tarbiat library which was the first library in Iran. Tarbiat was a writer active in the Iranian Constitutional Revolution and a member of the National Consultative Assembly from the electorate of Tabriz (1931-1940).

Biography

Mohammad Ali Tarbiat was born in 1877 in Nobar, near Tabriz, (province of Azerbaijan, Iran) into a cultured family, an ancestor was secretary to Nader Shah (1688-1747). He predominantly studied natural sciences and medicine at Tabriz.

He taught natural sciences for two years at Dar el Fonoun in the higher education establishment (university) in Tabriz.

In 1904, he married Robabeh (sister of Hassan Taghizadeh) from which he had four children, two sons (Ardechir and Bahman), and two daughters (Farangis and Iran).

Forced into exile after the dissolution of the Majlis (parliament) in 1908, he moved with his family to Istanbul. He undertook many trips to European capitals, chiefly London and Berlin where his wife deceased.

At the end of World War I, he returned to Istanbul and married Hadjar, daughter of a Persian embassy employee, from which he had two sons (Firouz and Behrouz).

He returns to Tabriz permanently in 1921.He was in charge of the organization of education of the Azerbaijan province, after which, he became mayor of Tabriz from 1928 to 1931.  From 1931 to 1940 he was a member of the parliament elected by Tabriz population.  January 17, 1940 he expired in Teheran.

Political activity

In the beginning years of the 1900s, together with Hassan Taghizadeh, he formed a militant group with young intellectuals aimed to modernize and westernize the country.

In 1905, he actively participated in the constitutional revolution. The Majlis (parliament) was founded in 1906; however, the constitutional revolution did not achieve its goals and in 1908 Mozzaffaredin Shah (Khadjar dynasty) had the Majlis bombarded resulting in the dissolving of the parliament.

In exile from 1908, Mohammed Ali Tarbiat continued his political activity in Istanbul and Berlin. Together with Hassan Taghizadeh and other activists he participated to the creation of Komiteh-ye IRAN (committee of Iran), as well as, in the publication of the Kaveh newspaper. The paper was written in Persian and published in Berlin from 1916 to 1922. It was a cultural and political journal, which proclaimed the necessity to carry out reforms in Iran and to preserve, the independence of Iran from foreign powers.

Under the reign of Reza Shah Pahlavi, Mohammad Ali Tarbiat was one of the founders of the Iranian democratic party (1930).

Social activity

Together with the group created in 1900 he tried to pass on Western culture to the young. They founded the Tarbiat school and its library, with the aim of promoting science and foreign languages (French, English and Russian), as well as a newspaper and a printing project. Faced with the opposition of reactionary forces, particularly from the clergy, the project was abandoned.

Back in Tabriz, the different functions he occupied permitted him to promote culture and modernization of the Azerbaijan province.  

In 1921, he created the first reading room and public library in Iran. Presently still in use, today it bears the name Tarbiat public library

He created many schools, including the highly contested high school for girls

He created the first public garden in Iran. This garden, called Golestan, is still today visited by the inhabitants of Tabriz

In 2015 a statue representing Mohammad Ali Tarbiat was erected in Tabriz

Writings
Mohammad Ali Tarbiat has written several articles in journals particularly in the journal Kaveh published in Berlin.

He has written two books:
 The history of journalism in Iran
 The scholars of Azerbaijan

See also
 Tarbiyat street

References

 

People from Tabriz
1877 births
1940 deaths
Iranian revolutionaries
Iranian journalists
People of the Persian Constitutional Revolution
Deputies of Tabriz for National Consultative Assembly
Mayors of Tabriz
Democrat Party (Persia) politicians
Tarbiat